Tee Off, known in Japan as , is a video game developed and published by Bottom Up and Acclaim Entertainment in 1999-2000.

Reception

The game received average reviews according to the review aggregation website GameRankings. In Japan, Famitsu gave it a score of 28 out of 40.

References

External links
 

1999 video games
Acclaim Entertainment games
Dreamcast games
Dreamcast-only games
Golf video games
Video games developed in Japan
Multiplayer and single-player video games